Cyanocephalus is a genus of flowering plants belonging to the family Lamiaceae.

Its native range is Cuba, Brazil to Paraguay.

Species:

Cyanocephalus adpressus 
Cyanocephalus apertiflorus 
Cyanocephalus bombycinus 
Cyanocephalus caprariifolius 
Cyanocephalus cardiophyllus 
Cyanocephalus coriaceus 
Cyanocephalus cretatus 
Cyanocephalus cuneatus 
Cyanocephalus delicatulus 
Cyanocephalus desertorum 
Cyanocephalus digitatus 
Cyanocephalus incanus 
Cyanocephalus lanatus 
Cyanocephalus lippioides 
Cyanocephalus nitidulus 
Cyanocephalus pedalipes 
Cyanocephalus peduncularis 
Cyanocephalus poliodes 
Cyanocephalus rugosus 
Cyanocephalus selaginifolius 
Cyanocephalus tacianae 
Cyanocephalus tagetifolius 
Cyanocephalus tenuifolius 
Cyanocephalus tripartitus 
Cyanocephalus viaticus

References

Lamiaceae
Lamiaceae genera